Woodlawn Station can refer to several stations on rail transit systems:

Woodlawn station (Charlotte), a light rail station in Charlotte, North Carolina
Woodlawn (IRT Jerome Avenue Line), a New York City Subway station in the Bronx, New York
Woodlawn station (Metro-North), a commuter rail station in the Bronx, New York, near the Woodlawn New York City Subway station
Woodlawn railway station, a passenger rail station near Woodlawn in County Galway, Ireland
Aliquippa Station or Woodlawn Station, a defunct station in Aliquippa, Pennsylvania

See also
Woodlawn (disambiguation)